Cassipourea obovata is a species of plant in the Rhizophoraceae family. It is endemic to Mozambique.

References

obovata
Data deficient plants
Endemic flora of Mozambique
Taxonomy articles created by Polbot